Marwahi is one of the 90 Legislative Assembly constituencies of Chhattisgarh state in India. It is in Gaurela-Pendra-Marwahi district and is reserved for candidates belonging to the Scheduled Tribes. It is a segment of Korba Lok Sabha constituency.

Members of Vidhan Sabha

Results

2020 by-election
A by-election was needed due to the death of the sitting MLA Ajit Jogi.

2018

See also
Gaurela-Pendra-Marwahi district
 Marwahi
 List of constituencies of Chhattisgarh Legislative Assembly

References

Gaurella-Pendra-Marwahi district, Chhattisgarh
Assembly constituencies of Chhattisgarh